Fort Cumberland (built 1754) was an 18th-century frontier fort at the current site of Cumberland, Maryland, USA. It was an important military and economic center during the French and Indian War (1754–63) and figured significantly in the early career of George Washington.

History
At the current location of the city of Cumberland, Maryland, a crude frontier fort was constructed at the confluence of Wills Creek and the Potomac River in fall 1754 by troops of the Maryland militia, under the command of Captain John Dagworthy, and under the overall command of Colonel James Innes, the commander-in-chief of colonial forces at that time. A few years earlier, Thomas Cresap had established a trading post nearby, and hired Native Americans including the local chief Nemacolin to blaze a shorter path across the Allegheny Mountains to Redstone Creek on the Monongahela River, which became known as Nemacolin's Path.  Initially named Fort Mount Pleasant, it was renamed Fort Cumberland in 1755. Ft Cumberland figured prominently in the French & Indian War in 1755, when it became a rally point for British forces under command of 
General Braddock. The wood palisade fort is now gone, and occupying the site is the existing Emmanuel Episcopal Church, but the old fort tunnels still remain underneath.

This fort once marked the westernmost outpost of the British Empire in America, and was the jumping-off point for General Braddock's disastrous expedition against the French at Fort Duquesne in present-day Pittsburgh, Pennsylvania. When Braddock was killed, a young officer of Virginia militia, George Washington, led the troops back to Fort Cumberland. At the fort, Washington clashed with Captain Dagworthy over the issue of military rank and which colonial officer should be in command: Washington was a Major in the Virginia militia, outranking the Maryland Captain, but Dagworthy countered that because he also held a Royal commission as a Captain in the Provincial Troops, he automatically outranked any colonial militia officer.

Description
In May 1755, one of the British officers with General Braddock described the newly christened Fort Cumberland: "[It] is situated within 200 yards of Will's Creek, on a hill and about 400 from the Potomack; its length from east to west is about 200 yards, and breadth 46 yards, and is built by logs driven into the ground, and about 12 feet above it." Eleven days later, he reported that 100 carpenters were at work building a magazine and constructing a bridge over Will's Creek.<ref>The Johns Hopkins University Press, The C&O Canal Companion' (2001), Notes on Fort Cumberland ; accessed 13 October 2010.</ref>

Diagrams and drawings of the Fort exist in the British Museum. A scale model of the fort resides in the aforementioned church .

Fort Cumberland's dependent forts
Fort Ohio, Earlier fort built across the river in Ridgeley, West Virginia
Fort Sellers
Fort Ashby, Earlier fort built in Fort Ashby, West Virginia.
Fort Cocke, Earlier fort built upstream from Fort Ashby, West Virginia
Fort Pleasant (Fort Van Meter), On the upper South Branch

References

Will H. Lowdermilk, "History of Cumberland"'', Clearfield Co., October 1997, Paperback, . Full Text Online
Ansel Jr. William H. Frontier Forts Along the Potomac and Its Tributaries, 1984, McClain Printing Co., .
Chartrand, Rene Monongahela 1754-55, Washington's Defeat, Braddock's Disaster, Osprey, 2004, .
Clites Sr. Gary Ridgeley and Carpendale, West Virginia From 1750 A History, 2008, Knobley Mountain Press, .
Fenwick, George Map of the Potomac River and Wagon Road to Monogahela River, 1800, drawn by George Fenwick, based on the surveys of Colonel Francis Deakins, NPS, MARS Facilities, Abner Cloud collection, ABCL 000041.
Fort Cumberland Bicentennial, 1755-1955 Souvenir program, 1955, Commercial Press, Cumberland (out-of-print) (Allegany College Library).
Fowler, William M. Jr. Empires Collide: French & Indian War 1754-1763, 2006, Osprey, .
Hansrote, Hazel Groves Historic Fort Cumberland Maryland, 1979, Preservation Society of Allegany County (MD). (out-of-print) (Allegany College Library).
Hunt, J. William, "Nearly Half Century of Cumberland History Associated with George Washington," Cumberland Times-News, 1955. (Allegany College Library).
Muller, John A Treatise Containing the Practical Part of Fortification, 1755. London. Reprinted 2010, .
Powell, Allan, Fort Cumberland, 1989, . (out-of-print) (Allegany College Library).
Powell, Allan, Maryland and the French and Indian War, Gateway Press; 1st edition (1998), ASIN B004ZRLCCO., Gateway Press; 1st edition (1998), ASIN B004ZRLCCO.

Stegmaier, Harry Jr., et al. Allegany County - A History, 1976, McClain Publishing, Parsons, WV. .
 British Library, http://catalogue.bl.uk, System number 004987636, A Plan of Fort Cumberland, on Will’ Creek and Potomack River…., scale 1:960, 12 Feb. 1755. Part of King George III’s topological collection.
British Library, http://catalogue.bl.uk	System number 004987637, A Plan of the fort and barracks at Mount Pleasant (Fort Cumberland)…1755, scale 1:420, Part of King George III’s topological collection.
Stakem, Patrick H. Fort Cumberland, Global War in the Appalachians: A Resource Guide, 2012, PRB Press, ASIN B0088BWK06.

Fort Cumberland
Cumberland
Cumberland
British-American culture in Maryland
Cumberland
Cumberland
1754 establishments in Maryland